Serbo-Croatian is a South Slavic language that, like most other Slavic languages, has an extensive system of inflection. This article describes exclusively the grammar of the Shtokavian dialect, which is a part of the South Slavic dialect continuum and the basis for the Bosnian, Croatian, Montenegrin, and Serbian standard variants of Serbo-Croatian. "An examination of all the major 'levels' of language shows that BCS is clearly a single language with a single grammatical system."

Pronouns, nouns, adjectives and some numerals decline (change the word ending to reflect case, the grammatical category and function) whereas verbs conjugate for person and tense. As in other Slavic languages, the basic word order is subject–verb–object (SVO), but the declensions show sentence structure and so word order is not as important as in more analytic languages, such as English or Chinese. Deviations from the standard SVO order are stylistically marked and may be employed to convey a particular emphasis, mood or overall tone, according to the intentions of the speaker or writer. Often, such deviations will sound literary, poetical or archaic.

Nouns have three grammatical genders (masculine, feminine and neuter) that correspond, to a certain extent, with the word ending. Accordingly, most nouns with -a are feminine, -o and -e neuter, and the rest mostly masculine but with some feminine. The grammatical gender of a noun affects the morphology of other parts of speech (adjectives, pronouns, and verbs) attached to it. Nouns are declined into seven cases: nominative, genitive, dative, accusative, vocative, locative, and instrumental, albeit with considerable overlap especially in the plural.

Verbs are divided into two broad classes according to their aspect, which can be either perfective (signifying a completed action) or imperfective (action is incomplete or repetitive). There are seven tenses, four of which (present, perfect, future I and II) are used in contemporary Serbo-Croatian, and the other three (aorist, imperfect and pluperfect) used much less frequently. The pluperfect is generally limited to written language and some more educated speakers, and the aorist and imperfect are considered stylistically marked and rather archaic. However, some nonstandard dialects make considerable (and thus unremarked) use of those tenses. Aorist and pluperfect are typically more used in villages and small towns of Serbia than in standard language, even in villages close to the Serbian capital Belgrade. In some parts of Serbia, the aorist can even be the most common past tense.

All Serbo-Croatian lexemes in this article are spelled in accented form in the Latin alphabet as well as in Ijekavian and Ekavian (with Ijekavian bracketed) when these differ. See Serbo-Croatian phonology.

Nouns
Serbo-Croatian makes a distinction between three genders (masculine, feminine and neuter) seven cases (nominative, genitive, dative, accusative, vocative, locative, instrumental) and two numbers (singular and plural).

Declension

Serbo-Croatian has three main declensional types, traditionally called a-type, e-type and i-type respectively, according to their genitive singular ending.

a-type nouns
This type reflects Proto-Slavic o-stems, and is characterized by the endings (-o), (-e), or zero (-Ø) in the nominative singular, and (-a) in genitive singular. It includes most of the masculine and all of the neuter nouns.

The category of animacy is important for choosing of accusative singular of o-stems, and of personal pronouns. Animate nouns have the accusative case like the genitive, and inanimate nouns have the accusative case like the nominative. This is also important for adjectives and numerals that agree with masculine nouns in case.

This type has two sets of case endings: one for masculine, and the other for neuter gender:

The zero ending -Ø is for masculine nouns that end in consonant in nominative singular. Most masculine monosyllabic and some bisyllabic words receive an additional suffix -ov- or -ev- throughout the plural (bor – borovi 'pine', panj – panjevi 'stump').

The choice of -o- and -e- endings in the nominative, vocative and instrumental singular, as well as the plural suffix -ov-/-ev-, is governed by the stem-final consonant: if it is a "soft" (chiefly palatal consonant – c, č, ć, đ, j, lj, nj, š, ž, št, and sometimes r), -e- endings are used, and -o endings otherwise; however, there are exceptions.

Some loanwords, chiefly of French origin, preserve the ending vowel (-e, -i, -o, -u) as part of the stem; those ending in -i receive an additional epenthetic -j- suffix in oblique cases: kàfē – kafèi 'café', pànō – panòi 'billboard', kànū – kanùi 'canoe', tàksi – taksiji 'taxi'. They are always of masculine gender; loanwords ending in -a are typically of the e-declension class (feminine); neuter nouns are basically a closed class.

Masculine nouns
Masculine nouns belonging to this declension class are those that are not hypocorisms, and do not end in -a, which undergo e-type declension.

According to the nominative singular forms they are divided in two classes:
 nouns having the zero ending -Ø in nominative singular (twelve declensional patterns)
 nouns having the ending -o or -e in nominative singular (two declensional patterns)

Masculine nouns ending in -o or -e present a special case. They generally comprise personal names, hypocorisms and certain foreign-language borrowings.

Neuter nouns
Neuter nouns end in -o, -e and -∅.

Neuter nouns ending in -o
The final o is always a suffix. Nouns which have at least two consonants (except st and zd) before the final o have disappearing a in genitive plural.

The noun dȑvo can mean 'wood', in which case it is declined as above (without disappearing a); and 'tree', where it can be declined either as above (without disappearing a) or as an imparisyllabic form below:

When the nouns ȍko and ȕho mean 'eye' and 'ear', except after a number ending with two-to-four, their plurals are feminine; their plurals are neuter otherwise.

Nouns čȕdo 'miracle', kȍlo 'wheel', nȅbo 'sky', tijêlo 'body' and ȕho 'ear', in addition to parisyllabic form plurals without disappearing a, have imparisyllabic plurals formed by appending -es- to the base. These plurals are used differently. The nominative plural of ȕho is ušèsa, and the nominative plural of tijêlo is tjelèsa.

Neuter nouns ending in -e
The final e can be a suffix, so the noun is parisyllabic, and it can belong to the noun base, in which case the noun is not parisyllabic. The noun is parisyllabic if it ends with -je (except jáje in singular), -lje, -nje (except jȁnje), -će, -đe, -ce (except pȕce and tùce), -šte, -šće or -žđe. The nouns môre and tlȅ are also parisyllabic. If a noun has at least two consonants before the final e, it has a disappearing a in genitive plural. This is not the case if the noun ends with -šte, -šće, -žđe or -je. Nouns representing living things do not have plural forms, but their plurality is marked with a collective noun formed with -ād (téle, n. sg. singulare tantum → tȅlād, f. sg. singulare tantum) or by using a noun formed with -ići (pȉle, n. sg. singulare tantum → pȉlići, m. pl.). The noun dijéte 'child' is a singulare tantum and uses the collective noun djèca, f. sg. singulare tantum, but plural with verbs, instead of a plural form.

Other neuter nouns 
The pluralia tantum nouns vráta, ústa and plúća can have the suffix -ijū in genitive plural: vrátijū, ústijū, plúćijū. The only neuter noun ending in -a is dȍba/dôba:

e-type nouns
This type reflects Proto-Slavic a-stems, and is characterized by the ending -a in nominative singular and -ē in genitive singular. It contains most of the feminine nouns, and a small number of masculines.

i-type nouns
This type reflects Proto-Slavic i-stems, and is characterized by the zero ending in nominative singular and -i in genitive singular. It contains the rest of feminine nouns, i.e., those that are not contained in the e-type nouns (a-stems).

Some nouns appear only in the plural form and do not have a singular variant (see plurale tantum). The gender of these nouns is either feminine (e.g. hlače 'trousers', gaće 'pants', grudi 'chest') or neuter (e.g. kola 'car', leđa 'back', usta 'mouth').

Pronouns

Serbo-Croatian allows deletion of the subject pronoun, because the inflected verb already contains information about its subject (see pro-drop language). Example:

Bojim se. 'I am afraid.'
Bojiš se. You are afraid.
Možeš reći što god hoćeš. 'You can say whatever you want.'

(Note: The words in the brackets represent shorter, unstressed versions of the pronouns that are very often used instead of longer, stressed versions. Those unstressed versions, however, only occur in genitive, accusative and dative.)

Adjectives
Some of the declensions for adjectives are the same as for nouns: velika kuća (sing. fem. nom.), veliku kuću (sing. fem. acc.). Others differ: velikog stana (sing. masc. gen.), jednim klikom 'with one click' (sing. masc. instrum.).

* same as nominative if a word is marking inanimate object; same as genitive if a word is marking animate object.

 Note: animate objects (people and animals) are treated differently in the singular masculine accusative. In this case, it is the same as singular masculine genitive. It is considered accusative even though it looks like the genitive. Example: Vidim velikog psa 'I see a big dog'.
 Note: most adjectives ending in consonant-'a'-consonant (for example: dobar 'good'), the 'a' disappears when any sound is added. Dobar becomes, for example, dobri, dobra, dobrog, dobru, dobrim, dobrom, dobre, and dobrih, according to case and number.

Numerals
Nouns modified by numerals are in the genitive case. As a vestige of the dual number, 2, 3, and 4 take the genitive singular, and 5 and above take the genitive plural.
 jedan pas (one dog)
 tri psa (three dogs)
 pet pasa (five dogs)

Verbs
Like those of other Slavic languages, Serbo-Croatian verbs have a property of aspect: the perfective and the imperfective. Perfective indicates an action that is completed or sudden, while the imperfective denotes continuous, repeated, or habitual action. Aspect compensates for a relative lack of tenses compared with e.g. Germanic or Romance languages: the verb already contains the information whether the action is completed or lasting, so there is no general distinction between continuous and perfect tenses.

Slavic verbs in general are characterized by a relatively low number of stems, from which a wide variety of meanings is achieved by prefixation.

Tense 
The indicative has seven tenses: present, past, futures I and II, pluperfect, aorist and imperfect. The latter two are not used often in daily speech (more often in Bosnia and Herzegovina than in Croatia and Serbia), especially the imperfect. The present, aorist, and imperfect are formed through inflection, and the other tenses are periphrastic:

 Past uses the present of biti 'to be' plus the perfect participle, e.g. radio sam (or sam radio, order depending on the sentence).
 Future I uses the (reduced) present of htjeti 'will' or 'to want' plus the infinitive, e.g. ćemo kuhati (or kuhat ćemo, in which case the -i of the infinitive marker -ti is elided).
 Future II uses the perfective future of biti (the only verb with a simple future) plus the perfect participle, e.g. budu išli.
 Pluperfect, which is not often used, uses the composite past tense of biti plus the perfect participle, e.g. bio sam došao, or (archaic) imperfect of biti plus the participle, e.g. bijah došao

Future tense can also be formed with (reduced) present of hteti plus the conjunction da and the present of the main verb, e.g. ćeš da kuvaš in Serbian, but this form is incorrect in Croatian. Also, whereas in Croatian it would be radit ćemo, in Serbian the t can be omitted and the verbs merged into radićemo.

Mood 

 
Besides the indicative, Serbo-Croatian uses the imperative, conditional, and the optative. Imperative forms vary according to the type of the verb, and is formed by adding the appropriate morpheme to a verbal stem. The conditional I (present) uses the aorist of biti plus perfect participle, while conditional II (past) consists of the perfect participle of biti, the aorist of the same verb, and the perfect participle of the main verb. Some grammars classify future II as a conditional tense, or even a mood of its own.

Optative is in its form identical to the perfect participle. It is used by speakers to express a strong wish, e.g. Živio predsjednik! 'Long live the president!', Dabogda ti se sjeme zatrlo! 'May God let your seed destroyed' (an archaic and dialectal curse), etc. The optative may be translated into English by an imperative construction, with set phrases (such as the already exemplified 'long live'), or by use of the modal verb may.

Some authors suggest existence of subjunctive mood, realized as da plus the present of indicative, but most grammars treat it as present indicative.

Aspect 
Verbal aspect is distinguished in English by using the simple or progressive (continuous) forms. 'He washed the dishes' indicates that the action was finished; 'He was washing the dishes' indicates that the action was ongoing (progressive). Serbo-Croatian, like all Slavic languages, has the aspect built into the verbs, rather than expressing it with different tenses.

To compare the meanings of the different aspects with verbal aspect in English, one should know three basic aspects: completed (may be called preterit, aorist, or perfect according to the language in question), progressive (on-going but not completed yet, durative), and iterative (habitual or repeated). English uses one aspect for completed and iterative and another for progressive. Serbo-Croatian uses one for completed and another for iterative and progressive.

Aspect is the most challenging part of Serbo-Croatian grammar. Although aspect exists in all other Slavic languages, learners of Serbo-Croatian who already know even one of several other Slavic languages may never learn to use aspect correctly, though they will be understood with only rare problems. While there are bi-aspectual verbs as well, primarily those derived by adding the suffix -irati or -ovati, the majority of verbs not derived in such a manner are either perfective (svršeni) or imperfective (nesvršeni). Almost all of the single aspectual verbs are part of a perfective–imperfective pair of verbs. When learning a verb, one must learn its verbal aspect, and the other verb for the opposite verbal aspect, e.g. prati 'to do washing' (imperfective) goes with oprati 'to wash' (perfective). The pairing, however, is not always one to one: some verbs simply don't have a counterpart on a semantic level, such as izgledati 'seem' or sadržati 'contain'. In others, there are several perfective alternatives with slightly different meanings.

There are two paradigms concerning formation of verb pairs. In one paradigm, the base verb is imperfective, such as prati 'to wash'. In this case the perfective is formed by adding a prefix, in this case o, as in oprati. In the other paradigm, the root verb is perfective, and the imperfective is formed either by modifying the root: dignuti→dizati 'to lift' or adding an interfix stati→stajati 'to stop', 'to stand'.

A pattern which often arises can be illustrated with pisati 'to write'. Pisati is imperfective, so a prefix is needed to make it perfective, in this case na-: napisati. But if other prefixes are added, modifying the meaning, the verb becomes perfective: zapisati 'to write down' or prepisati 'to copy by hand'. Since these basic verbs are perfective, an interfix is needed to make them imperfective: zapisivati and prepisivati. In some cases, this could be continued by adding a prefix: pozapisivati and isprepisivati which are again perfective.

Conjugation 

There are three conjugations of verbs:
 'a': almost all verbs that have this conjugation end in '-ati'.
 'e': verbs ending in '-nuti' and all irregular verbs (as in the example below). Verbs ending in '-ovati', '-ivati' become 'uje' when conjugated (trovati 'to poison' is trujem, truje etc.)
 'i': almost all verbs ending in '-jeti' or '-iti' use this conjugation.

Auxiliary verbs 

As in most other Indo-European languages including English, the Indo-European copula ('to be') is used as an auxiliary verb. It is universally irregular, because conjugations of two proto-forms *h1es- (>English is) and *bʰuH- (>English be) merged, producing mixed paradigms: the former being used in the present, and the latter in the other tenses. In Serbo-Croatian, however, there are two present forms surviving: jesam ('I am') and budem ('I be'). Because of that dualism, some grammars (chiefly Serbian ones) treat jesam as a defective verb having only present tense. Others treat these forms as two realizations of the same irregular verb biti, jesam being imperfective and budem perfective.

Jesam has the following declension in the present tense. It has long and clitic (short) forms (without leading je), while its negative form is written as one word, unlike other verbs (compare English is–isn't). The short and the negative forms are used as auxiliary, while the long form is marked.

The copulative use of the verb јеsam matches that of the verb 'to be' in English (e.g. He is a student – On је učenik), of course, in the present tense only. The 'true' forms present of the verb biti, (budem) have a limited use (in formation of the future exact tense, or in conditional clauses referring to the future, e.g. ako budem – if I am).

Verb biti is conjugated as follows:

Regular verbs 

The conjugation system of regular verbs is rather complex. There are several classes of verbs distinguished according to certain features verbs within a class share.
The verb is raditi (To work)

This paradigm applies to verbs such as:
vidjeti (to see)hodati (to walk) pričati (to talk) morati (must)

Irregular verbs 
Irregular verbs are more complex to conjugate than regular verbs, for example the verb moći (can, to be able to)

Adverbs

Adverbs in Serbo-Croatian are, unlike nouns, verbs, adjectives, pronouns and numbers, and like prepositions, conjunctions, exclamations and particles, immutable words. Adverbs are, thus, immutable words given to verbs to determine the time, place, manner, cause, point and the amount of the action of the verb. There are seven types of adverbs in Serbo-Croatian:

Place adverbs

Place adverbs answer the questions where? (gdje?), to where? (kamo?), which way? (kuda?), from where? (otkuda?, odakle?) and to where? (dokle?, dokud?). Examples for each type are:
gde/gdje? (where)
ovde/ovdje (here),
negde/negdje (somewhere),
nigde/nigdje (nowhere),
igde/igdje (anywhere),
gore (up),
dole/dolje (down),
odpozadi/straga (from behind),
napolju/vani (outside)
blizu (close by);
kuda/kamo? (to where)
ovamo (to here)
napred/naprijed (forwards)
nazad (backwards);
kuda? (which way)
ovuda (this way),
kojekuda (otišli su kojekuda – they dispersed),
otkuda? (from where)
 odavde (from here),
niotkuda (from nowhere),
izdaleka (from far away)
dokle? (to where):
dotle (to here, also used as 'in the mean time', dotle su oni čekali),
donekle (up to a point).

Temporal adverbs

Temporal adverbs, or vremenski prilozi, answer the questions when? (kada?), from when? (otkad?), until when? (dokad?). Examples are: kada (when) – sada (now), tada (then), nikada (never), ponekad (sometimes), uvijek (always), jučer (yesterday), danas (today), sutra (tomorrow), prekosutra (the day after tomorrow), lani (last year), večeras (tonight), odmah/smjesta (now/at once), zatim (then), uskoro (soon), napokon (at last); otkad (from when) – odsad (from now on), oduvijek (from always – oduvijek sam te volio – I have (from) always loved you); dokad (until when) – dosad (until now), dogodine (next year).

Prepositions

Each preposition has an assigned case. If an inflectable word follows a preposition, the word is declined in the same case as the preposition's assigned case.

Genitive prepositions:
od, do, iz, s(a), ispred, iza, izvan, van, unutar, iznad, ispod, više, poviše, niže, prije, uoči, poslije, nakon, za, tijekom, tokom, dno (podno, nadno, odno), vrh (povrh, navrh, uvrh, zavrh), čelo, nakraj, onkraj, krajem, potkraj, sred (nasred, posred, usred), oko, okolo, blizu, kod, kraj, pokraj, pored, nadomak, nadohvat, i, u, mimo, duž, uzduž, širom, diljem, preko, bez, osim, mjesto (umjesto, namjesto), uime, putem, (s) pomoću, posredstvom, između, (na)spram, put, protiv, nasuprot, usuprot, usprkos, unatoč, zbog, uslijed, radi (zaradi, poradi), glede, prigodom, prilikom, povodom
Dative prepositions:
k(a), prema, naprama, nadomak, nadohvat, nasuprot, usuprot, usprkos, unatoč, protiv
Accusative prepositions:
kroz, niz, uz, na, o, po, u, mimo, među, nad, pod, pred, za
Locative prepositions:
na, o, po, prema, pri, u
Instrumental prepositions:
s(a), pred, za, nad(a), pod(a), među

Dynamic v. Static
Some prepositions fall in two or more cases. The ones that fall in both the accusative and locative cases, the preposition is accusative if it is dynamic and is locative if it is static. Dynamic means that the preposition shows motion while static does not.

Examples:
Ja idem u školu. I am going to school. (dynamic)
Ja sam u školi. I am in school. (static)

Conjunctions and particles

Syntax

Word order
Serbo-Croatian has a rich case structure that is reflected in the declension of nouns and adjectives. That allows for a great deal of freedom in word order. In English, for example, the word order shows a difference in meaning between "Man bites dog" and "Dog bites man". In Serbo-Croatian, Čovjek grize psa and Čovjeka grize pas have the same word order, but the meanings are shown by the noun endings. Any order of the three constituents is grammatically correct, and the meaning is clear because of the declensions. However, the usual order is subject–verb–object, as in English.

Serbo-Croatian closely observes Wackernagel's Law that clitics (unstressed functional words) are placed in the second position in all clauses. The first element may be a single word or a noun phrase: Taj je čovjek rekao 'That man (has) said', or Taj čovjek je rekao. Multiple clitics are grouped in the following fixed order:
 question word (only li),
 verbs: clitic forms of 'to be' except je (sam, si, smo, ste, su, bih, bi, bismo, biste), and of 'will' (ću, ćeš, će, ćemo, and ćete)
 dative pronouns (mi, ti, mu, joj, nam, vam, im, si),
 accusative pronouns (me, te, ga, je, ju, nas, vas, ih),
 the reflexive accusative pronoun (only se),
 clitic form of the third-person singular present of 'to be' (je).

Relative clauses
Relative clauses are frequent in modern Serbo-Croatian since they have expanded as attributes at the expense of the participles performing that function.

The most frequent relativizer is the relative pronoun koji. It has the greatest range of antecedents, which, however, are mostly nouns or personal pronouns. Nouns are the word class with attributes, and the relative clause is most frequently an attributive clause. The frequency of the adjectival pronoun koji is greater than those relative pronouns that cannot have an antecedent noun (tko ʻwhoʼ and the declinable type of što 'what'). Also, it occurs much more frequently than other adjectival relative pronouns: in comparison with their specialized semantic functions such as possessiveness (čiji 'whose'), quality (kakav 'what sort of') or quantity (koliki 'how large'), the pronoun koji has the broadest scope of reference and identification with the referent.

See also
 Ausbausprache
 Differences between Serbo-Croatian standard varieties
 Language secessionism in Serbo-Croatian
 Mutual intelligibility
 Pluricentric Serbo-Croatian language
 Serbo-Croatian language
 Serbo-Croatian phonology
 Serbo-Croatian kinship
 Serbo-Croatian relative clauses
 Shtokavian dialect
 South Slavic dialect continuum
 Standard language

References

Further reading

 
 
 
 

 
 
 
 
 
 
  [1st pub ]
  (CROLIB).
  (CROLIB).
  (CROLIB).
  Contents. Summary.
  Summary.
 
  (ÖNB).
 
 
 
 
 
 
 
 
 
 
 
 
 
 
 

Serbo-Croatian language
Croatian language
Serbian language
Bosnian language
Montenegrin language
Slavic grammars